The Fremantle Team of Legends was selected to recognise legends of Australian rules football in Fremantle, Western Australia.

Selection criteria 
The main selection criteria for players selected in the team was that they must have played 100 games for either of the Fremantle-based WAFA/WAFL/WANFL clubs. The players must have also been significant figures in Australian rules football and their club(s).

Selectors 
Choosing the team were:
 John O'Connell (Claremont Football Club player) – chairman
 Brian Atkinson – football historian
 Tony Parentich (South Fremantle Football Club player)
 Laurie Nugent (East Fremantle Football Club player)
 Trevor Sprigg (East Fremantle Football Club player)
 George Grljusich – football commentator

Team
The final selected team was announced at the Foundation Day Derby Ball on 2 June 2007. It also involved the commissioning of a jumper to commemorate the team which consisted of the colours of the two Fremantle WAFL teams. The sleeveless jumper is predominantly white with red trimming around the neck and sleeve lines and two blue thin hoops around the stomach region with a Titan holding a shield in the left hand and sword in the right. The word "Fremantle" is above the Titan and "Legends" is below the Titan.

See also
 Greek Team of the Century
 VFL/AFL Italian Team of the Century
 Indigenous Team of the Century

Notes
 East Fremantle has 12 players and South Fremantle 10 players in the team
 The team consisted of 8 Sandover Medallists, 18 WAFL Hall of Fame members and 6 AFL Hall of Fame members.

References

Australian rules football awards
Australian rules football representative teams